Shin Saw Hla was a principal queen consort of King Wareru of Martaban. She became Wareru's wife  1293 when her father Tarabya of Pegu, and Wareru entered into an alliance by marrying each other's daughter.

The alliance fell apart a few years later  1296 when her husband defeated and executed her father. Nonetheless, she apparently remained a queen consort of Wareru since chronicles do not explicitly say that she was removed from position.

References

Bibliography
 

Queens consort of Hanthawaddy